Trechus apache is a species of ground beetle in the subfamily Trechinae. It was described by Dajoz in 1990.

References

apache
Beetles described in 1990